The 2020 MotoAmerica Championship (known as 2020 HONOS FIM MotoAmerica Championship for sponsorship reasons) was the 6th season of the MotoAmerica Championship.

Classes

Superbike 
MotoAmerica’s premier race class, HONOS Superbike showcases the top road racers aboard top-of-the-line, highly modified motorcycles capable of speeds approaching 200 miles per hour. Engine configurations and minimum weight requirements are listed below:

 Over 750cc up to 1000cc, 4-stroke, 3- and 4-cylinder
 Over 850cc up to 1200cc, 4-stroke, 2-cylinder
 370.5 pounds
 Models: BMW S1000RR, Ducati Panigale V4 R, Honda CBR1000RR, Kawasaki Ninja ZX-10R, Suzuki GSX-R1000, Yamaha YZF-R1

Stock 1000 
A feeder class for Superbike, Stock 1000 gives MotoAmerica riders the opportunity to gain experience aboard 1,000cc motorcycles with an eye toward eventually moving up to Superbike. Engine configurations requirements are listed below:

 Over 750cc up to 1000cc, 4-stroke, 3- and 4-cylinder
 Over 850cc up to 1200cc, 4-stroke, 2-cylinder
 374 pounds
 Models: BMW S1000RR, Honda CBR1000RR, Kawasaki Ninja ZX-10R, Suzuki GSX-R1000, Yamaha YZF-R1

Supersport 
MotoAmerica’s middleweight race class, Supersport features the series’ rising stars competing aboard production-based motorcycles. Engine configurations and minimum weight requirements are listed below:

 Over 400cc up to 600cc, 4-stroke, 4-cylinder
 Over 500cc up to 675cc, 4-stroke, 3-cylinder
 Over 600cc up to 750cc, 4-stroke, 2-cylinder
 354.2 pounds
 Models: Kawasaki Ninja ZX-6R, Suzuki GSX-R600, Yamaha YZF-R6

Twins 
Putting middleweight, twin-cylinder motorcycles in the spotlight, Twins Cup enables regional and club racers from around the country to step up to the MotoAmerica series and compete on a national level. Engine configurations requirements are listed below:

 Over 600cc up to 800cc, 4-stroke, 2-cylinder
 Over 600cc up to 700cc: 297.6 pounds
 Over 700cc up to 800cc: 319.6 pounds
 Models: Kawasaki Ninja 650, Suzuki SV650, Yamaha FZ-07/MT-07

Junior Cup 
MotoAmerica’s entry-level race class, Liqui Moly Junior Cup presents the series’ youngest riders competing aboard small-displacement, production-based motorcycles. Engine configurations requirements are listed below:

 Over 300cc up to 500cc, 4-stroke, 1- or 2-cylinder
 Models: Honda CBR500R, Kawasaki Ninja 400, Yamaha YZF-R3

Race calendar and results 
A provisional 9-event calendar was announced on 13 April 2020.

Championship Standings 

Points were awarded as follows:

Superbike

Stock 1000

Supersport

Twins

Junior Cup

References

External links
 

MotoAmerica
MotoAmerica